AllMovie (previously All Movie Guide) is an online database with information about films, television programs, and screen actors. , AllMovie.com and the AllMovie consumer brand are owned by RhythmOne.

History

AllMovie was founded by popular-culture archivist Michael Erlewine, who also founded AllMusic and AllGame.

The AllMovie database was licensed to tens of thousands of distributors and retailers for point-of-sale systems, websites and kiosks. The AllMovie database is comprehensive, including basic product information, cast and production credits, plot synopsis, professional reviews, biographies, relational links and more.

AllMovie data was accessed on the web at the AllMovie website. It was also available via the AMG LASSO media recognition service, which can automatically recognize DVDs.

In late 2007, TiVo Corporation acquired AMG for a reported $72 million.

The AMG consumer facing web properties AllMusic.com, AllMovie.com and AllGame.com were sold by Rovi in August 2013 to All Media Network, LLC. The buyers also include the original founders of SideReel and Ackrell Capital investor Mike Ackrell.

RhythmOne offices are located in San Francisco, California, and Ann Arbor, Michigan, United States.

See also 
 AllMusic
 AllGame
 SideReel
 All Media Network
 IMDb

References

External links

 

Online film databases
American film review websites
Entertainment companies based in California
Internet properties established in 1998
Mass media companies established in 1998
1998 establishments in California